The canton of Trouy is an administrative division of the Cher department, in central France. It was created at the French canton reorganisation which came into effect in March 2015. Its seat is in Trouy.

It consists of the following communes: 
 
Annoix 
Arçay
Chambon
Châteauneuf-sur-Cher
Chavannes
Corquoy
Crézançay-sur-Cher
Lapan
Levet
Lissay-Lochy
Plaimpied-Givaudins
Saint-Caprais
Saint-Just
Saint-Loup-des-Chaumes
Saint-Symphorien
Senneçay
Serruelles
Soye-en-Septaine
Trouy
Uzay-le-Venon
Vallenay
Venesmes
Vorly

References

Cantons of Cher (department)